Nicalin is a protein that in humans is encoded by the NCLN gene.

References

Further reading

Human proteins